Sandeep Nisansala (born 26 April 1995) is a Sri Lankan cricketer. He made his List A debut on 19 December 2019, for Kurunegala Youth Cricket Club in the 2019–20 Invitation Limited Over Tournament.

References

External links
 

1995 births
Living people
Sri Lankan cricketers
Kurunegala Youth Cricket Club cricketers
Place of birth missing (living people)